"Nick of Time" is a song by American blues musician Bonnie Raitt. Taken as the third single from her 10th solo album of the same name (1989), the song was released in May 1990. The song debuted at number 94 and reached its peak of 92 a week later on the Hot 100 chart. It also earned a top 10 placement on the Adult Contemporary Chart.

Composition
Raitt wrote most of the song during a week-long cabin retreat in Mendocino, California, and she recorded a homemade demo on her own. 

The song was inspired by a culmination of observations about aging. The first verse ("A friend of mine, she cries at night...") was taken from a conversation Raitt had with a heartbroken friend who was nearing middle age and desperately wanting a baby, and the song also featured her singing about her own parents (“I see my folks, they’re getting old…”). 

The singer recalled: "In his vulnerable state I could see he was getting older and could really feel what it was like for a body to age. This whole idea of time and it being more precious as you age, I realized this would be what I'd write about."

Chart performance
The song was popular on multiple formats of radio: it peaked at number 10 on Billboard's Adult Contemporary chart, and number 92 on the Billboard Hot 100. The song also placed at 82 on the UK Singles Chart. Despite its limited commercial success, the record became one of Raitt's most defining songs.

Nominations and awards
Raitt won the Best Female Pop Vocal Performance at the 32nd Annual Grammy Awards for her recording of this song. Bonnie Raitt received three more wins at the ceremony, including Album of the Year.

References

External links
 

1980s ballads
1989 songs
1990 singles
Bonnie Raitt songs
Capitol Records singles
Grammy Award for Best Female Pop Vocal Performance
Pop ballads
Song recordings produced by Don Was
Songs about old age